Dong-Eui University is one of the private universities in Busan, a metropolitan city on the southeastern coast of South Korea.  The university has 10 colleges, 116 master and doctoral courses in six graduate schools, with 22,992 students and 1,690 faculty and staff members.  Dong-Eui has gained fame in the fields of Korean medicine and engineering and has built solid reputations in other fields such as management, health sciences, nursing, and a range of sciences.

Colleges and graduate schools

Colleges
College of Humanities
College of Law and Government
College of Commerce and Economics
College of Natural Sciences
College of Korean Medicine
College of Human Ecology
College of Engineering
College of Visual Image and Information Technology
College of Art and Design
College of Sport Science

Graduate schools
Graduate School
Graduate School of Public Administration
Graduate School of Business
Graduate School of Industry
Graduate School of Education
Graduate School of Visual Image and Information

History

The university opened in 1979, as a four-year college (Dong-Eui College, or 동의대학) with 400 students. It was established by the Dong-Eui Educational Foundation (est. 1966), which had also established a middle school, a high school and a junior college. Beginning in 1976, the foundation had also operated Kyungdong Engineering Professional School on the future site of the university campus. The college became a university in 1983, and opened its graduate school the following year.

University libraries

The holdings of the University Library system include more than one million book volumes and 2,000 current serial publications. The library contains maps, newspapers, microforms, government documents, CD-ROMs, research reports, and videos. The system consists of Central Library and Korean Medicine Library.

Intercollegiate athletics
The university has a rich heritage in intercollegiate athletics. The university has baseball, men's soccer, men's judo and fencing teams. The baseball team has won national championships four times.

Student housing
The university maintains four residence hall complexes, which house approximately 3,200 students.

Notable people
Juno, singer
Kim Yoon-seok, actor
Oh Dal-su, actor

See also
List of colleges and universities in South Korea
Education in South Korea

References

External links
 Dong-Eui University (English)
Dong-Eui University Hospital, Busan (English)

Universities and colleges in Busan
1977 establishments in South Korea
Educational institutions established in 1977